Pushpa Narayan-Robless (born 6 November 1978) is a Malaysian entrepreneur, actress, model and of Malaysian Indian origin, who achieved popularity through her roles in several TV shows. Narayan has acted in Malay and Tamil Language dramas and movies.

Personal life
Pushpa was born to a Malaysian Indian family in Jerantut, Pahang. She married Richard Frederick Robless, a Malaysian Eurasian. Together, the couple has two children, Rhea Rosa Robless and Robert Richard.

Career
She became famous after placing second at the 2002 Dewi Remaja. She later joined Miss Malaysia Universe 2004 and placed second to the actual winner, Andrea Fonseka. She also won the Miss Love & Lace Photogenic and Miss Health and Beauty subsidiary awards during the pageant. She then branched into acting and find success in local entertainment industry. In 2005 she also worked in a Pakistani drama Masuri.

Filmography
Below is a list of Pushpa Narayan's most notable work in film and television.

Television

Film

References

External links
 

1978 births
Living people
People from Pahang
Malaysian film actresses
Malaysian television actresses
Malaysian people of Indian descent
Malaysian people of Tamil descent
Malaysian beauty pageant winners
Malaysian Christians
21st-century Malaysian actresses